Youssef Sofiane (born 8 July 1984, in Villefranche-sur-Saône) is a French footballer who played in England, the Netherlands, France, Belgium, Algeria and Germany.

Club career
Of Algerian descent, Sofiane began his footballing career in August 2000 as a trainee at AJ Auxerre. He joined West Ham United in June 2002, when he was signed by manager Glenn Roeder on a free transfer as back-up to the club's strikers. Opportunities were rare however and he made only two appearances for West Ham, as a substitute in a 2–1 away win against Preston, and in a 3–1 win over Rushden in the first round of the League Cup, both in August 2003. He was loaned to Lille in January 2004 until the end of the 2003–04 season, and to Notts County on a one-month loan deal in September 2004, where he made three appearances, scoring one goal against Wrexham in the Football League Trophy. He then joined Dutch club Roda JC on loan through January–May 2005, where he made three substitute appearances. Despite playing in pre-season games, he was not given a squad number by West Ham for the 2005–06 season and his contract was terminated by mutual consent in August 2005. After trials with MK Dons and Coventry City, he joined Coventry on non-contract terms in October 2005. However, he made only one substitute appearance for Coventry before being released in January 2006.

After leaving Coventry, he played for La Louviere in the Belgian Jupiler League, Sportfreunde Siegen of the German Regionalliga, and US Lesquin in France.

On 7 December 2011, Sofiane signed an 18-month contract with ES Sétif. He signed as a free agent having been without a club after his contract with MC Alger ended in summer 2011.

Sofiane later became a football agent.

Representative honours
Sofiane represented France at Under-15 to Under-18 level.

Honours
ES Sétif
Algerian Cup: 2012

References

External links

1984 births
Living people
Sportspeople from Villefranche-sur-Saône
French sportspeople of Algerian descent
French footballers
AJ Auxerre players
West Ham United F.C. players
Lille OSC players
Notts County F.C. players
Coventry City F.C. players
English Football League players
R.A.A. Louviéroise players
Sportfreunde Siegen players
Algerian footballers
Ligue 1 players
Belgian Pro League players
Eredivisie players
Expatriate footballers in England
Expatriate footballers in Germany
Expatriate footballers in Belgium
Expatriate footballers in the Netherlands
MC Alger players
ES Sétif players
Algerian Ligue Professionnelle 1 players
France youth international footballers
US Lesquin players
Association football forwards
Footballers from Auvergne-Rhône-Alpes
Association football agents